The florin sign (ƒ) is a symbol that is used for the currencies named florin, also called guilder. The Dutch name for the currency is gulden. The symbol "ƒ" is the lowercase version of Ƒ of the Latin alphabet. In many serif typefaces, it can often be substituted with a normal italic small-letter f.

It is used in the following current and obsolete currencies (between brackets their ISO 4217 currency codes):

Current:
Aruban florin (AWG)
Netherlands Antillean guilder (ANG)

Obsolete:
Dutch guilder (NLG; until 2002)
Surinamese guilder (SRG; until 2004)
Italian florin (until 1533)

Currency symbols